Gedea is a genus of the spider family Salticidae (jumping spiders). Its species occur in Asia from China to Java.

Species
As of May 2020, the World Spider Catalog lists the following species in the genus:
 Gedea daoxianensis Song & Gong, 1992 – China
 Gedea flavogularis Simon, 1902 – Java
 Gedea fungiformis (Xiao & Yin, 1991) – China 
 Gedea okinawaensis Ikeda, 2013 – Japan
 Gedea pinguis Cao & Li, 2016 – China 
 Gedea sinensis Song & Chai, 1991 – China
 Gedea tibialis Zabka, 1985 – Vietnam
 Gedea typica (Zabka, 1985) – Vietnam 
 Gedea unguiformis Xiao & Yin, 1991 – China
 Gedea zabkai (Prószyński & Deeleman-Reinhold, 2010) – Bali

Three species, Gedea fungiformis, Gedea typica and Gedea zabkai, were previously placed in the genus Meata, now subsumed into Gedea.

References

External links
 Description and Drawings

Salticidae
Spiders of Asia
Salticidae genera